Main Aisi Kyunn Hoon is a Hindi television serial that was shown on Sahara One channel worldwide starting from 8 October 2007 to 22 August 2008. It is based on the story of a middle-class girl Sanjana Patil, a strong-headed girl with modern outlook on life despite being born to a traditional family. It was shown on weekdays at 8:30pm.

Plot
Sanjana Patil, who has imagination and a great sense of humor. She is modern in her thoughts despite being born in a middle-class joint family. Like any ordinary Indian family, Sanjana's family also pressure her to get married since she is nearing her 30s. But Sanjana has been in love with her childhood sweetheart Siddharth who is in the US, pursuing his further studies and is waiting to marry him.

Like any other love story, this story also has twist when Sanjana discovers that the man she loves (Siddharth) has been married to her boss Anuradha. Now, she is completely shattered and unable to face the reality. She wants to know to a great extent that why Siddharth broke his promise and married someone else and how she will face the man who she is in love with, who is now married to someone else.

The story takes off when caught between her modern feelings and traditional values, Sanjana refuses to move on and chooses to live in her past.

Cast 
 Nazneen Patel as Sanjana Patil
 Aamir Dalvi as Rahul Oberoi, Sanjana's fiancé
 Khalid Siddiqui as Siddharth, Anuradha's husband and Sanjana's childhood friend/love
 Anokhi Shrivastav as Anuradha, Siddharth's wife
 Mohan Bhandari as Mr Oberoi, builder
 Savita Prabhune as Pushpa, Sanjana's mother
 Amit Dolawat as Vicky Mehta, Anuradha's friend
 Vishal Puri as Vikram, Sanjana's fiancé

External links 
Main Aisi Kyunn Hoon on Sahara One

2007 Indian television series debuts
Indian television soap operas
Sahara One original programming
2008 Indian television series endings